Vsevolod Mstislavich was a son of Mstislav II of Kiev and Agnes, the daughter of King Boleslaus III of Poland. Vsevolod was Prince of Belz and Prince of Volodymyr. He died in 1196.

Family
 Aleksandr (?-1234)
 Vsevolod
 Anastasia, married to Bolesław I of Masovia
 daughter
 Vsevolod (?-1215)
 Olena (possibly)

External links
 Monomakh branch (Volhynia) at Izbornik

12th-century princes in Kievan Rus'
1196 deaths
Eastern Orthodox monarchs
Year of birth unknown
Izyaslavichi family (Volhynia)